Heath is a city in Licking County, Ohio, United States, and is located approximately 30 mi (48 km) east of Columbus. The population was 10,310 at the 2010 census. It is one of three cities in the county.

History 
This area is known to have been populated by the Hopewell Indians through the first century CE. They built large earthworks, including ancient burial mounds which are now preserved within Moundbuilders State Memorial on the north side of the city.

This also has the Great Circle Earthwork, considered part of the Newark Earthworks, which has two other sections within the boundaries of nearby Newark, Ohio. The complex originally covered more than 3,000 acres, and was surveyed before 1850 by a team for the Smithsonian Institution. The -wide Newark Great Circle is one of the largest circular earthwork in the Americas, at least in construction effort.

The Newark Earthworks is operated as a state park by the Ohio History Connection.  Designated as a National Historic Landmark, in 2006 the Newark Earthworks was also designated as the "official prehistoric monument of the State of Ohio."

European-American settlement
Early European-American settlement did not take place until the nineteenth century. Much of the county was originally devoted to agriculture. In the process of clearing and cultivating land, farmers destroyed some of the earthworks in the 19th and 20th centuries. Other development also encroached on the ancient works.

After World War II, Newark Air Force Base was established here, and it operated for 35 years as the seat of United States Air Force Aerospace Guidance and Metrology Center. This function is now served by AFMETCAL and the contractor-operated Air Force Primary Standards Lab.

Heath was incorporated as a village in 1952, with Richard Hoback being elected as the first mayor. Over the next decade Heath grew quickly, going from a population of 2,426 in 1960 to 6,066 in 1965, when it was chartered as the 196th city in Ohio. It is one of three in the county.

In 1986 Indian Mound Mall opened here, the first and only indoor shopping mall in Licking County. By 1990 the city had a population of 7,231. Despite the large population growth on the western edge of Licking County, Heath remains the third-largest municipality in the county, and one of only three cities. Other residential areas nearby include Newark, Granville, and Hebron.

Geography

Demographics

2010 census
As of the census of 2010, there were 10,310 people, 4,131 households, and 2,772 families residing in the city. The racial makeup of the city was 93.7% White, 2.6% African American, 0.2% Native American, 0.7% Asian, 0.6% from other races, and 2.2% from two or more races. Hispanic or Latino of any race were 1.5% of the population.

There were 4,131 households, of which 32.8% had children under the age of 18 living with them, 49.0% were married couples living together, 13.1% had a female householder with no husband present, 5.1% had a male householder with no wife present, and 32.9% were non-families. 27.6% of all households were made up of individuals, and 13.2% had someone living alone who was 65 years of age or older. The average household size was 2.45 and the average family size was 2.96.

The median age in the city was 40.1 years. 24.3% of residents were under the age of 18; 7.8% were between the ages of 18 and 24; 24.7% were from 25 to 44; 26.2% were from 45 to 64; and 16.9% were 65 years of age or older. The gender makeup of the city was 47.9% male and 52.1% female.

2000 census
As of the census of 2000, there were 8,527 people, 3,403 households, and 2,375 families residing in the city. The population density was 816.6 people per square mile (315.4/km2). There were 3,593 housing units at an average density of 344.1 per square mile (132.9/km2). The racial makeup of the city was 95.59% White, 1.98% African American, 0.33% Native American, 0.82% Asian, 0.01% Pacific Islander, 0.32% from other races, and 0.95% from two or more races. Hispanic or Latino of any race were 1.01% of the population.

There were 3,403 households, out of which 32.9% had children under the age of 18 living with them, 55.1% were married couples living together, 10.9% had a female householder with no husband present, and 30.2% were non-families. 25.5% of all households were made up of individuals, and 10.8% had someone living alone who was 65 years of age or older. The average household size was 2.46 and the average family size was 2.94.

In the city, the population was spread out, with 24.9% under the age of 18, 8.1% from 18 to 24, 29.7% from 25 to 44, 22.3% from 45 to 64, and 15.0% who were 65 years of age or older. The median age was 37 years. For every 100 females, there were 90.2 males. For every 100 females age 18 and over, there were 87.0 males.

The median income for a household in the city was $40,120, and the median income for a family was $50,156. Males had a median income of $35,781 versus $25,143 for females. The per capita income for the city was $20,890. About 4.2% of families and 8.5% of the population were below the poverty line, including 10.2% of those under age 18 and 11.4% of those age 65 or over.

Economy
Businesses related to Air Force metrology continue to be important in Heath. Major employers include the following:

•American Electric Power, electric power services.
•Bayer Material Science, compounded plastics services. 
•Bionetics, metrology calibration and measurement services.
•Boeing Guidance Repair Center, guidance and navigation system repair services. 
•Central Ohio Aerospace and Technology Center (COATC) Base Campus.
•Englefield Oil Co., Inc. company headquarters.
•Gummer Wholesale, warehouse.
•Heath City School District, education. 
•Heath Nursing Care Center, skilled nursing facility.
•Kaiser Aluminum, manufacturing service. 
•Licco Inc., sheltered workshop. 
•Lowe's Home Improvements.

Arts and culture
Heath offers numerous service clubs and organizations for those interested including: 211 Pathways, American Legion (Post 771), Boy Scouts troop (#9), Civil Air Patrol, Cub Scouts Pack (#9), Heath Girl Scouts, Heath Kiwanis, LaSertoma, Heath Lions, Marine Corps League, Mental Health America, Prevent Assault and Violence Education (P.A.V.E.), Newark-Heath Rotary, and Heath Sertoma.

Parks and recreation
In 2002, Heath celebrated 50 years since it was established. The city hosts an annual Oktoberfest celebration at the Davis-Shai House. An Independence Day celebration takes place at Geller Park on July 2, which includes food, games, live bands, and a fireworks show starting at dark.

The city has 10 parks and recreation areas that are maintained by the Parks and Recreation Department. These include Heath City Waterpark, Geller Park, Beryl Dean Penick Park, Canal Lock Park, Davis Shai House, Dorsey Mill Park, Forry Preserve, Hitchcock Park, and Hoback Park. It also has a Bike Trail System that extends throughout the city.

From July 2011 to fall of 2012, the city had a major construction project on Route 79. The shoulders of the street were widened to accommodate the project. The city added medians to the middle of the road that included mulch with trees and flowers. Left turns and U-turns were added to southbound traffic at the intersection of Andover Road and Oberlin Drive, and Northbound and Southbound traffic at the intersection of Putnam Road and Radian Drive.

Government 
The City of Heath has an elected mayor and seven-member city council: four members are elected at-large, and three from each of three designated wards of the city, operating as single-member districts. This means that most members must gain a majority of votes across the city.

The council members include Deb Cole, At-Large; Jeff Crabill, At-Large; Tim Kelley, President At-Large; Brian Johnson, Ward 1; Dick Morrow, Ward 2; Doug Heffley, Ward 3; and Cledys Henry, President Pro Tem. At-Large.

Mayors: The mayor is elected at-large.

Heath has its own police and fire departments: Warren McCord is Chief of City of Heath Fire Department. They respond to about 2,400 calls for service annually. David Haren serves as Chief of Heath Police Department. The police respond to around 16,000 calls annually.

The city has a municipal income tax of 2.0%.

Education 
Heath City Schools operates four schools in its public school district. 
 Heath High School (9-12)
 Heath Middle School (6-8)
 Stevenson Elementary School (3-5)
 Garfield Elementary School (K-2)
 Fulton Middle School (Closed, later demolished)

Heath also has two private, independent schools. 
 Licking County Christian Academy (K-12)
 Newark Seventh Day Adventist (K-7)

References

External links

Cities in Licking County, Ohio
Populated places established in 1952
1952 establishments in Ohio
Cities in Ohio